Fort Cobb State Park is a  Oklahoma state park located in Caddo County, Oklahoma, USA. It is located near the city of Fort Cobb. The park offers recreational activities and facilities including camping, fishing, boating, water sports, swimming, hiking and golf. A visitors' center is located on site, as well as a gift shop, bait and tackle shop, RV sites with water and electric hook-ups, primitive camping areas, scenic views of the lake, comfort stations, laundry facilities, picnic sites, three playgrounds, two swimming areas and marina. Equipment rentals are available. The park also has an 18-hole golf course with practice range, putting green and pro shop. The park has 282 RV sites, 35 of which have sewer, and 102 tent campsites.

Fees
To help fund a backlog of deferred maintenance and park improvements, the state implemented an entrance fee for this park and 21 others effective June 15, 2020. The fees, charged per vehicle, start at $10 per day for a single-day or $8 for residents with an Oklahoma license plate or Oklahoma tribal plate. Fees are waived for honorably discharged veterans and Oklahoma residents age 62 & older and their spouses. Passes good for three days or a week are also available; annual passes good at all 22 state parks charging fees are offered at a cost of $75 for out-of-state visitors or $60 for Oklahoma residents. The 22 parks are:
 Arrowhead Area at Lake Eufaula State Park
 Beavers Bend State Park
 Boiling Springs State Park
 Cherokee Landing State Park
 Fort Cobb State Park
 Foss State Park
 Honey Creek Area at Grand Lake State Park
 Great Plains State Park
 Great Salt Plains State Park
 Greenleaf State Park
 Keystone State Park
 Lake Eufaula State Park
 Lake Murray State Park
 Lake Texoma State Park
 Lake Thunderbird State Park
 Lake Wister State Park
 Natural Falls State Park
 Osage Hills State Park
 Robbers Cave State Park
 Sequoyah State Park
 Tenkiller State Park
 Twin Bridges Area at Grand Lake State Park

References

State parks of Oklahoma
Protected areas of Caddo County, Oklahoma